Nikaia-Agios Ioannis Rentis is a municipality in the Piraeus regional unit, Attica, Greece. The seat of the municipality is the town Nikaia. The municipality has an area of 11.173 km2.

Municipality
The municipality Nikaia-Agios Ioannis Rentis was formed at the 2011 local government reform by the merger of the following 2 former municipalities, that became municipal units:
Agios Ioannis Rentis
Nikaia

References

 
Municipalities of Attica
Populated places in Piraeus (regional unit)